Om Prakash Sakhlecha, is an Indian politician and elected member (MLA) from Jawad Vidhan Sabha constituency, district Neemuch in Madhya Pradesh state. In June 2020 he was appointed Cabinet Minister in Shivraj Singh Chouhan Government which formed in Madhya Pradesh after Jyotiraditya Scindia along with his 22 MLAs rebelled against Congress and toppled Kamalnath Government. Currently he is Minister for MSME Sector and Minister of Science and Technology under Shivraj Singh Chouhan govt. He is member of the Bharatiya Janata Party.

Biography 
Mr. Sakhlecha was born on 3 October 1958, to Virendra Kumar Sakhlecha and Chetan Sakhlecha. He graduated from Delhi University in Commerce in 1979.

He married Sangeeta Sakhlecha, a gold medalist from Bombay University on 10 December 1982. Om Prakash and Sangeeta Sakhlecha have two children, daughter, Trisha Sakhlecha and son, Rishabh Sakhlecha.

His father, Virendra Kumar Sakhlecha, was a prominent politician from Jawad and held the posts of Chief Minister (1978 to 1980) and Deputy Chief Minister (1967 to 1969). He was also a member of the Rajya Sabha, from 1972 to 1977.

References

1958 births
Living people
Bharatiya Janata Party politicians from Madhya Pradesh
Madhya Pradesh MLAs 2003–2008
Madhya Pradesh MLAs 2008–2013
Madhya Pradesh MLAs 2013–2018
Madhya Pradesh MLAs 2018–2023